Cryon is a parish and hamlet in the north-west of New South Wales, Australia. When the Walgett railway line arrived here in 1905 this was a thriving settlement with a variety of businesses including a hotel and stores. For quite a few years it was the loading point for cattle from South West Queensland that were railed to the Sydney market. The railway now only carries freight (grain).

Only a few buildings remain, together with a wheat silo and several new bunker storages.

The main industry is wheat farming with some livestock raised.

References
Lightning Ridge, Walgett and District; published by Walgett Shire, 2000

External links

Towns in New South Wales
Walgett Shire